Patterson Creek is a  long 2nd order tributary to the Deep River in Lee County, North Carolina.

Course
Patterson Creek rises in a pond about 1 mile west of Sanford, North Carolina and then flows north to the Deep River about 1.5 miles southeast of Gulf, North Carolina.

Watershed
Patterson Creek drains  of area, receives about 47.7 in/year of precipitation, and has a wetness index of 383.71 and is about 72% forested.

See also
List of rivers of North Carolina

References

Rivers of North Carolina
Rivers of Lee County, North Carolina